Ashwin Mahesh is an urbanist, journalist, politician and social technologist based in Bangalore. After his education in atmospheric science (PhD) and astronomy (MS), he worked as a climate scientist at NASA before switching to a career in governance reforms and urban development. He was a prominent member of the Loksatta movement working for administrative, electoral and governance reforms, and thereafter became the National Vice President of the Lok Satta Party. In July 2016, when the party decided to quit electoral politics, he resigned his position, and began to work closely with the Aam Aadmi Party. He is a co-founder of the national public affairs magazine, India Together. He also founded the social technology firm, Mapunity, and is one of the co-founders of the electric vehicles-based transportation company, Lithium. He is also a founder member of Bangalore Political Action Committee (BPAC). Ashwin Mahesh was awarded the Ashoka Fellowship in 2009.

Personal life
Ashwin Mahesh did his schooling at Army High School, Bengaluru and Vidya Mandir Senior Secondary School (1986), Chennai and then studied Physics at St Joseph's College of Arts and Science (1989). Later, he did his MBA from Pondicherry University (1991), M.S. in Astronomy from Vanderbilt University (1993) and PhD in Atmospheric Science/Climate Science/Geophysics from the University of Washington (1999). He is married to Sapana Rawat and has two daughters, Aditi and Mahiti. He returned to Bangalore in 2004.

Career
Ashwin Mahesh was a research faculty at NASA Goddard Earth Science and Technology Centre in USA. During his Masters studies at Vanderbilt University guided by David Weintraub, he helped develop a technique for discovering newly forming stars, and this was used to discovered a star, known as 'the companion to LkHα 234'. From 1993 to 2005, he was an atmospheric scientist studying clouds and snow in Antarctica with Stephen Warren, and later working on satellite-based cloud detection technologies. His PhD and subsequent work helped improve algorithms for cloud detection over snow and ice-covered surfaces, and this was later confirmed by the launch of the first space-borne laser by the Geoscience Laser Altimeter Satellite mission team that he was part of.

After returning from the US, Ashwin became a researcher at IIM, Bangalore & at the CiSTUP in IISc. He was also an adjunct faculty member at International Institute of Information Technology, Bangalore. and Urban Research Strategist at the Office of Urban Affairs for the Karnataka government. Ashwin become a driving force behind numerous urban development projects in Bangalore including rationalisation of the BMTC bus service, traffic management solutions, cleaning up and preservation of lakes. He was also part of the Agenda for Bengaluru Infrastructure and Development Task Force (ABIDe).

Ashwin has founded a number of social enterprises. He was listed in The Smart List 2012: 50 people whose ideas will change the world by Wired UK. He was awarded the Ashoka Fellowship for Social Development. In 1998, he co-founded India Together, an online magazine that covers public affairs, policy and development in India. He co-founded & is the CEO of Mapunity, a social tech company in Bangalore, that develops IT-led solutions to social problems and development challenges in India. In October 2014, he co-founded India's first 100% Electric Vehicles-based transportation service, Lithium, which began deploying electric vehicles to serve the employee transportation market in metro cities; he briefly took over as the interim CEO of the company in February 2020, but returned to Mapunity and India Together at the of the year, and to establish the How Institute - a Centre for Public Problem Solving, an action-research group for building capacity in public administration and planning.

During the second wave of the Covid-19 pandemic in 2021, Ashwin helped create the #CovidRural volunteer group in 100+ districts across several states that worked with district and taluk hospitals to help them find donors for new infrastructure, medical devices and supplies. The How Institute also began working on an initiative to make CSR funding in India more impactful. He is also interested in heritage and history, and is part of the Kaliloka team documenting the vernacular architectural traditions of the different districts of Karnataka. Ashwin is a childhood polio survivor, and is a Director at Artilab Foundation, which incubates product and service innovations for disabled and elderly persons. He is also an advisor to Fourth Wave Foundation, which runs the Nanagu Shaale program for full inclusion of disabled children in schools. He has written for a number of news publications, including a regular column for the Deccan Herald since 2019.

Political career
Ashwin Mahesh was associated with the anti-corruption initiative, Corruption Saaku, since its inception, and later played an active role as it grew into India Against Corruption (IAC)'s demand for the Lokpal Bill. Ashwin ran his first political campaign in 2012 for the upper house of the Karnataka assembly, which he finished fourth. He had started many initiatives called Missed Call Campaign to raise awareness and increase the number of registered voters before the MLC elections. He had enrolled more than 15,000 voters, but ended up with only 4,349 votes in the Bangalore graduates' constituency elections. Bangalore Mirror newspaper noted, if every one of the voters Mr Mahesh enrolled for voting had turned up to cast their ballot on election day, he would have won by a thumping majority'.

In 2013, Karnataka Legislative Assembly elections, Ashwin Mahesh contested from the Bommanahalli constituency, garnered 11,915 votes and finished third. The Bangalore Political Action Committee (BPAC), an initiative which was launched by the business community of the IT capital of the nation, endorsed Ashwin in the Bommanahalli constituency. He secured 6.75 per cent of the total votes polled, beating even the Janata Dal(JDS) and Karnataka Janata Paksha (KJP) candidates.

During the 2015 city elections, and 2018 state elections, he was active in campaigning for Aam Aadmi Party. In 2022, he became the head of the Manifesto Committee of AAP Karnataka for the BBMP elections. The party introduced the Nammoora Charche dialogue with voters to create the manifesto, similar to the Delhi Dialogue it had used in elections there.

References

Ashoka India Fellows
Lok Satta Party politicians
Activists from Karnataka
Living people
Indian Institute of Science alumni
Pondicherry University alumni
Vanderbilt University alumni
University of Washington alumni
Politicians from Bangalore
Year of birth missing (living people)